Alan N. Shapiro (born 23 April 1956 in Brooklyn, New York) is an American science fiction and media theorist. He is a lecturer and essayist in the fields of science fiction studies, media theory, posthumanism, French philosophy, creative coding, technological art, sociology of culture, social choreography, software theory, robotics, artificial intelligence, and futuristic and transdisciplinary design. Shapiro's book and other published writings on Star Trek have contributed to a change in public perception about the importance of Star Trek for contemporary culture. His published essays on Jean Baudrillard - especially in the International Journal of Baudrillard Studies - have contributed to a change in public perception about the importance of Baudrillard's work for culture, philosophy, sociology, and design.

Shapiro has co-developed many of the core ideas of the emerging field of social choreography, contributing many essays to the field's most important journal, Choreograph.net. He is a founding member of the Institute for Social Choreography in Frankfurt. He has also contributed many essays to the journal of technology and society NoemaLab — on technological art, software theory, Computer Science 2.0, futuristic design, the political philosophy of the information society, and Baudrillard and the Situationists.

In 2010–2011, Shapiro lectured on "The Car of the Future" at Transmediale in Berlin, Germany, and on robots and androids at Ars Electronica. In September 2011, Shapiro gave a major speech at the Plektrum Festival in Tallinn, Estonia on "The Meaning of Life." Since 2011, Shapiro has been keynote speaker at several conferences: "Knowledge of the Future" at the University of Vienna (2011),  BOBCATSSS conference on Information Management of the organization of European university libraries (2012), IEEE Conference on the Information Society in London (2012), ISI International Symposium of Information Science, University of Applied Sciences in Potsdam (2013),  retune Creative Technology conference in Berlin (2013), Alig'Art Festival on Sustainability in Cagliari (2014), the conference on interactive media and utopia at Jagiellonian University, Krakow (2014), the conference on hyper-modernism at the National Center of Scientific Research, Paris (2016), the conference on art and politics in Italy, and the conference on transdisciplinary design, at the Folkwang University of the Arts, Essen (2017), the Zurich Design Biennale (2017), the Quadraga University "Transform Your Business" conference in Berlin (2018), and the Swiss National Additive Manufacturing conference in Lucerne (2018)
. In July 2012, Shapiro gave the International Flusser Lecture at the Vilém Flusser Archive, Institute for Time-Based Media, University of the Arts, Berlin. In October 2016, Shapiro gave a lecture on artificial intelligence and science fiction at the BASE Cultural Center, Milan that was attended by 350 people. In 2018, Shapiro spoke at the MACRO Museum of Contemporary Art in Rome, and at Pratt Institute of Design in Brooklyn, NY. In August 2019, Shapiro gave a lecture on Baudrillard in French at the renowned Cerisy-la-Salle cultural center in Normandy.
In February 2020, Shapiro gave a lecture on "Body, Self and Code in Hypermodernism" at the Schaubühne theater in Berlin that was attended by 450 people, as part of the Streitraum series of events moderated by Carolin Emcke. In July 2020, Shapiro was the keynote speaker at the European Union conference on "Media in the Digital Society," giving a talk entitled "How to Regulate the Media when they are ubiquitous and have gone viral:
from utopian science fiction to practical European policy." In October 2020, Shapiro was featured on the 3Sat German TV program Kulturzeit, as part of their 25th anniversary Zeitwende show, talking about Science Fiction as a utopian model of thinking.

The 2017 Audi Annual Report features a discussion about the impact of AI on society between Shapiro, Audi CEO Rupert Stadler, and David Hanson of Hanson Robotics, Hong Kong. Shapiro has also been featured as a thinker by Bertellsmann in "We Magazine", by Deutsche Bank in "Economy Stories," and in the technology and fashion print magazine WU (Milan).

Shapiro has been visiting professor in the Department of Film and New Media at the NABA (Nuova Accademia di Belle Arti) University of Arts and Design in Milan. He has also been a lecturer at the Goethe University in Frankfurt, at the Art and Design Universities in Offenbach (where he taught creative coding and futuristic design from 2012 to 2015) and Karlsruhe; at the Institute of Time-Based Media at the University of the Arts, Berlin; at Domus Academy of Design and Fashion in Milan; and at ABADIR Design Academy in Catania. From  October 2015 to September 2017, Shapiro was visiting professor of Transdisciplinary Design in the Department of Industrial Design at the Folkwang University of the Arts, Essen. Since October 2017, Shapiro is a lecturer in media theory at the Art University of Bremen, and teaches "design and informatics" at the University of Applied Sciences, Lucerne, Switzerland.

Shapiro is the editor and translator of The Technological Herbarium by Gianna Maria Gatti, a groundbreaking book about technological art. He has three contributions to the innovative book on social choreography Framemakers: Choreography as an Aesthetics of Change edited by Jeffrey Gormly. His book Software of the Future: The Model Precedes the Real was published in German by the Walther König Verlag in 2014. His edited book Transdisciplinary Design was published by the Passagen Verlag in 2017. He has chapters in the books Design und Mobilität: wie werden wir bewegt sein? (2019), Nevertheless: Manifestos and Digital Culture (2018), Searching for Heterotopia (2019), and Tracelation (2018).

Shapiro has published several widely cited essays on the disaster of Donald Trump in relation to hyper-modernism. In 2019, he published an influential essay on Dialogical Artificial Intelligence in the magazine of the German national cultural foundation. He has lectured several times on the meaning of Patrick McGoohan's TV show The Prisoner.

Shapiro is also a software developer, with nearly 20 years industry experience in C++ and Java development. He has worked on several projects for Volkswagen, Deutsche Bahn (DB Systel), and media and telecommunications companies.

Shapiro was accepted at age 15 as an undergraduate student at the Massachusetts Institute of Technology (MIT). He studied at MIT for 2 years. He received his B.A. from Cornell University, where he studied government and European Intellectual History. He has an M.A. in sociology from New York University (NYU). In a 10-page review-essay of his book Star Trek: Technologies of Disappearance, the journal Science Fiction Studies called his book one of the most original works in the field of science fiction theory. See also the extensive discussions of Star Trek: Technologies of Disappearance in Csicsery-Ronay's major reference work on science fiction studies, in The Routledge Companion to Science Fiction and in The Yearbook of English Studies.

Shapiro has lived almost exactly half of his life in the United States (32 years), and half in Europe (31 years—mostly in Germany, but also some years in Italy, Switzerland and France).

References

External links
Alan N. Shapiro: Technologist and Futurist''
lecture in Berlin on "The New Computer Science" December 8, 2009
"I Consider Star Trek to be a great text of Western Civilization," Joachim Scholl interviews Alan N. Shapiro.
article on Shapiro in the Berlin daily newspaper "Neues Deutschland" January 5, 2010
interview on Deutschlandradio, February 5, 2010
lecture in Amsterdam on Wikipedia at the Critical Point of View, Wikipedia Research Initiative conference, March 26, 2010
Alan N. Shapiro interviewed by Father Roderick about Star Trek, on Catholic WIFI radio
Alan N. Shapiro (together with Patrick Lichty and Father Roderick) interviewed by Erik Boekesteijn on Wikipedia and libraries, on vimeo show "This Week in Libraries."
Bayerischer Rundfunk 38-minute programme about the ideas and projects of Alan N. Shapiro, produced by Florian Fricke  March 26, 2010
"Re-Thinking Science," We-Magazine Special: Future Challenges, Bertelsmann Foundation, April 2010.
"Who Are the New Radical Thinkers in Europe?" (discussion with Franco Torriani) NoemaLab.org 2010
"Lost: The Crash Out of Globalization and into the World" AVINUS Press Online Magazine, 2007
video of lecture in Leipzig on "The Library of the Future" at the Critical Point of View, Wikipedia Research Initiative conference, September 26, 2010
"The Future of the Image, part one", Journal on Images and Culture, February 2013
112-minute radio programme about Mr. Shapiro on Estonia Public Broadcasting Radio 2 on the show »HALLO, KOSMOS!«, September 2011.
15-minute interview with Mr. Shapiro on the television program "Wonderland" on the Italian TV station RAI4, October 2012.
Interview with Mr. Shapiro about "Lost" on the television program "Mainstream" on the Italian TV station RAI4, June 2012.
Interview with Mr. Shapiro about "The Prisoner" on the television program "Mainstream" on the Italian TV station RAI4, June 2012.
Towards a New Green Politics, October 2012
Video Interview, May 2013
Software Code as Expanded Narration, February 2014
The Meaning of 'The Prisoner', April 2014
Storytelling and Ideas in the Age of Computer-Intensive Media Products, March 2015
The Internet of Creators, April 2015
Creative Commons, The Next Generation, July 2015
From Digital Culture to Quantum Culture, July 2015
As Creators Make Money, They Transform What Money Is, August 2015
nella nuova fantascienza gli androidi hanno un cuore Interview at Milan World Expo, September 2015 
Philosophy, Science and Ecology, December 2015
Creative Coding video, 2015
Donald Trump Casino Owner: Seduced to Losing by the Lure of Winning, February 2016
Homage to Bernie Sanders’ Democratic Socialism and George Orwell’s 1984, February 2016
The Paradox of Foreseeing the Future, February 2016
What is Hypermodernism?, March 2016
Fiktion ist der Schlüssel zu kreativen Lösungen, June 2016
Baudrillard and Trump: Simulation and Object-Orientation, Not True and False, January 2017
Baudrillard and Trump: The Fifth Order of Simulacra, February 2017
Light-Writing from Las Vegas, August 2017
Star Trek Forscher in Luzern, 2018 
Alan Shapiro: Dank Star Trek zur nächsten technischen Revolution, 2018
The Simulacra of Public Space: The Work of Christos Voutichtis, 2018
Gestalt-Ideas at the Interface between Theory and Practice, 2018
Gerry Coulter, Sophie Calle, and Baudrillard's Pursuit in Venice, November 2018
Zur Mobilität von Morgen, video interview, 2018
Mobility and Science Fiction, June 2019
The Prisoner as The Hostage and the Episode A.,B., and C, September 2019
Baudrillard's Importance for the Future, October 2019
Roadmap künstliches Leben: Auf dem weg zu dialogischer künstlicher Intelligenz, 2019

1956 births
Living people
American sociologists
Science fiction critics
American speculative fiction critics
Massachusetts Institute of Technology alumni
Cornell University alumni
New York University alumni